Viana is a low volcano in the southeastern part of the island of São Vicente, Cape Verde.

See also
 List of mountains in Cape Verde

References

External links
 Viana on mindelo.info 

Mountains of Cape Verde
Volcanoes of Cape Verde
Geography of São Vicente, Cape Verde